Olev Subbi (7 March 1930, Tartu – 19 August 2013) was an Estonian artist.

References

External links
Entry in the E-Kunstimuuseum

1930 births
2013 deaths
People from Tartu
Estonian illustrators
20th-century Estonian male artists
21st-century Estonian male artists
20th-century Estonian painters
21st-century Estonian painters
Hugo Treffner Gymnasium alumni
Estonian Academy of Arts alumni
People's Artists of the Estonian Soviet Socialist Republic (visual arts)
Recipients of the Order of the White Star, 2nd Class
Burials at Metsakalmistu